Yurginsky District  is an administrative district (raion), one of the twenty-two in Tyumen Oblast, Russia. As a municipal division, it is incorporated as Yurginsky Municipal District. It is located in the center of the oblast. Its administrative center is the rural locality (a selo) of Yurginskoye. Population: 12,313 (2010 Census);  The population of Yurginskoye accounts for 36.9% of the district's total population.

References

Notes

Sources

Districts of Tyumen Oblast